The Three of Us is a lost 1914 silent film drama directed by John W. Noble, produced by B. A. Rolfe, and starring Mabel Taliaferro and Creighton Hale. It was based on a 1906 play The Three of Us by Rachel Crothers.

Cast
Mabel Taliaferro - Rhy MacChesney
Creighton Hale - Clem
Master Stuart - Sonny
Edwin Carewe - Steve Towney
Irving Cummings - Louis Beresford
Madame Claire - Maggie

References

External links
 The Three of Us at IMDb.com

Adaptation in the February 1915 issue of Photoplay Magazine

1914 films
American silent feature films
Silent American drama films
1914 drama films
Lost American films
American films based on plays
American black-and-white films
Films directed by John W. Noble
1914 lost films
Lost drama films
1910s English-language films
1910s American films